Call to Glory is an American drama which was aired for 22 episodes during the 1984–1985 TV season (specifically from August 1984 to February 1985) on the 

The show focuses on USAF pilot Colonel Raynor Sarnac (Craig T. Nelson) and his family, living near Edwards Air Force Base, where Sarnac was stationed during the early 1960s.

Heavily promoted during ABC's broadcast of the 1984 Summer Olympics, the pilot episode was aired August 13, 1984.  The first episode is related to the U-2 flights over Cuba during the 1962 Cuban Missile Crisis.  During its production run, the show came to focus more on the loneliness experienced by wife Vanessa Sarnac (Cindy Pickett) while stationed on base and what she and the family would do to spend time in productive pursuits while enduring the Antelope Valley's isolation from civilization.

The series also stars Elisabeth Shue in one of her early roles as the eldest Sarnac child, daughter Jackie.  Also appearing in the series was David Lain Baker as Tom Bonelli; Baker would later become one of the judges on the competition show Forged in Fire.

Cast
Craig T. Nelson as Col. Raynor Sarnac
David Lain Baker as Tom Bonelli
Cindy Pickett as Vanessa Sarnac
Elisabeth Shue as Jackie Sarnac
Keenan Wynn as Carl Sarnac
David Hollander as Wesley Sarnac
Gabriel Damon as R.H. Sarnac
Thomas O'Brien as Patrick Thomas

Episodes

Production
Craig T. Nelson received familiarization rides in USAF jets at Edwards Air Force Base during the filming of the series, including flights in the T-38 Talon, the F-4 Phantom II, and the F-16 Fighting Falcon.  On one particular flight in the F-16, the aircraft suffered an electrical failure.  Nelson and his pilot prepared to bail out, however, the pilot was able to safely land the aircraft.

Call to Glory was filmed in Texas at Laughlin Air Force Base in Val Verde County, near Del Rio.

References

External links

YouTube – Call to Glory – opening credits

1984 American television series debuts
1985 American television series endings
1980s American drama television series
American Broadcasting Company original programming
Aviation television series
English-language television shows
American military television series
Television series by CBS Studios
Television series set in the 1960s
Television shows set in Texas
Television series about the United States Air Force